Photis Stephani (born 4 October 1971) is a Cypriot athlete. He competed in the men's pole vault at the 1992 Summer Olympics and the 2000 Summer Olympics.

References

1971 births
Living people
Athletes (track and field) at the 1992 Summer Olympics
Athletes (track and field) at the 2000 Summer Olympics
Cypriot male pole vaulters
Olympic athletes of Cyprus
Athletes (track and field) at the 1994 Commonwealth Games
Commonwealth Games competitors for Cyprus
World Athletics Championships athletes for Cyprus
Athletes (track and field) at the 1993 Mediterranean Games
Athletes (track and field) at the 2001 Mediterranean Games
Place of birth missing (living people)
Mediterranean Games competitors for Cyprus